The 2016–17 American Eagles men's basketball team represented American University during the 2016–17 NCAA Division I men's basketball season. The Eagles, led by fourth-year head coach Mike Brennan, played their home games at Bender Arena in Washington, D.C. as members of the Patriot League. They finished the season 8–22, 5–13 in Patriot League play to finish in a tie for ninth place. As the No. 9 seed in the Patriot League tournament, they lost in the first round to Army.

Previous season 
The Eagles finished the 2015–16 season 12–19, 9–9 in Patriot League play to finish in a four-way tie for fourth place. They defeated Boston University in the quarterfinals of the Patriot League tournament to advance the semifinals where they lost to Lehigh.

Offseason

Departures

Incoming transfers

2016 recruiting class

Roster

Schedule and results

|-
!colspan=9 style=| Non-conference regular season

|-
!colspan=9 style=| Patriot League regular season

|-
!colspan=9 style=| Patriot League tournament

See also
2016–17 American Eagles women's basketball team

References

American Eagles men's basketball seasons
American
American Eagles men's basketball
American Eagles men's basketball